Insub "Ins" Choi is a Korean Canadian actor and playwright best known for his Dora Mavor Moore Award-nominated 2011 play Kim's Convenience and its subsequent TV adaptation.

Choi was born in South Korea and raised in Toronto, Ontario. He is a graduate of the theatre program at York University.

Early life and education
Born Insub Choi in South Korea in 1974, Choi moved to Canada at the age of one and grew up in Scarborough, Ontario, which is now part of Toronto. His father was born in North Korea and "walked south" with his family as a child. Choi's mother grew up in South Korea, where she met and married her husband before emigrating to Canada with Choi and his two older sisters in 1975. His father worked as a pastor of an immigrant church in downtown Toronto that he owned and founded.

An immigration officer misspelled his name as "Insurp" and in Grade 9 Choi began using the name "Danny", inspired by John Travolta's character in Grease. When he attended the acting program at York University, he met other struggling Asian immigrants and began going by Ins, as a shortened form of his birth name. 

In high school, Choi played various sports and performed in a school play. After school he worked at convenience stores owned by friends of his parents. 

Choi attended North Toronto Collegiate Institute in the early 1990s. He graduated from York University's theatre program in 1998. His first application to the fine arts program at York was rejected. He completed a Master of Theological Studies at Wycliffe College, University of Toronto, graduating in 2002. He credits his success to his studies at Wycliffe, which he believes made him a better writer.

Career
Following his graduation from York University, Choi worked with fu-GEN, a Toronto-based Asian Canadian theatre company, which helped him figure out what he wanted to portray to an audience through his work. He stated that working with fu-GEN showed him "who [he] really was and what [he] really wanted to say mattered in the world of art," and it was there that he first envisioned Kim's Convenience, a play that eventually became a successful television series. He is credited as a co-creator, producer, and main screenwriter on the series, which ended after its fifth season.

Choi's 2013 one-man show, The Subway Stations of the Cross, was inspired by the homeless and mentally ill men he met in parks and public spaces across Toronto. He has also created the show, The Beats and the Breaks, about hip-hop, as well as The KJV: The Bible Show. In 2018 and 2019 Choi toured with his stage show Ins Choi: Songs, Stories and Spoken Word.

Personal life 
In March 2005, Choi married Mari, with whom he has two children. They reside in Toronto. He is a Christian.

References

1974 births
Living people
21st-century Canadian dramatists and playwrights
21st-century Canadian male writers
Canadian male actors of Korean descent
Canadian male dramatists and playwrights
Canadian male stage actors
Canadian writers of Asian descent
Male actors from Toronto
South Korean emigrants to Canada
Writers from Toronto
York University alumni